This is a list of players who have played for FC Brașov.

Nationality

Romania

Europe

South America

Africa

References

External links
Jucătorii cu cele mai multe meciuri pentru Steagu’ lastegaru.net 

 
Brasov
Association football player non-biographical articles